Tignish-Palmer Road is a provincial electoral district for the Legislative Assembly of Prince Edward Island, Canada. It was formerly Tignish-DeBlois from 1996 to 2007.

Members
The riding has elected the following Members of the Legislative Assembly:

Communities
It includes, among others, the following communities:
Tignish
Palmer Road
St. Felix
St. Louis (northern-half)
St. Edward (northern-half)
St. Roch
St. Peter & St. Paul
Norway
Christopher Cross
Peterville
Leoville
Harper
AscensionMiminegash (northern-half)
Nail Pond
Skinners Pond
Waterford
Pleasant View
Greenmount
Kildare
Deblois
Anglo–Tignish
Tignish Shore
Jude's Point
Seacow Pond

Election results

Tignish-Palmer Road, 2007–present

2016 electoral reform plebiscite results

Tignish-DeBlois, 1996–2007

References

 Tignish-Palmer Road information

Prince Edward Island provincial electoral districts